Uvanilla is a genus of sea snails, marine gastropod mollusks in the family Turbinidae, the turban snails.

Species
Species within the genus Uvanilla include:
 Uvanilla babelis (P. Fischer, 1874)  
 Uvanilla buschii (Philippi, 1844)
 Uvanilla olivacea (W. Wood, 1828)
 Uvanilla unguis (W. Wood, 1828)
Species brought into synonymy
 Uvanilla heimburgi Dunker, 1882: synonym of Astralium heimburgi (Dunker, 1882)

References

 Keen M. (1971) Sea shells of tropical West America. Marine mollusks from Baja California to Perú, ed. 2. Stanford University Press. 1064 pp.
 Alf A. & Kreipl K. (2011) The family Turbinidae. Subfamilies Turbininae Rafinesque, 1815 and Prisogasterinae Hickman & McLean, 1990. In: G.T. Poppe & K. Groh (eds), A Conchological Iconography. Hackenheim: Conchbooks. pp. 1–82, pls 104-245.

 
Turbinidae
Gastropod genera